A plant in the family Myrtaceae, Eugenia brachythrix is threatened due to habitat loss.  It is endemic to Jamaica and is found at the headwaters of the Mabess River.  It is also found, on occasion, in Grand Ridge.

References

brachythrix
Vulnerable plants
Endemic flora of Jamaica
Taxonomy articles created by Polbot